The 2008 Democratic Progressive Party chairmanship election took place on May 18, 2008. The election date was announced by chairperson Frank Hsieh after losing the presidential election.

Candidates 
Three members expressed their desire to run for the position:

Chai Trong-rong 
Chai Trong-rong, first president of the World United Formosans for Independence and former legislator, announced his candidacy on April 14, 2008. He withdrew from the election on May 12 and endorsed candidate Koo Kwang-ming.

Koo Kwang-ming

Tsai Ing-wen 
Tsai Ing-wen, former vice premier and former chairperson of the Mainland Affairs Council, won support from many local executives and decided to launch her campaign. She earned endorsements from Chiayi County magistrate Chen Ming-wen, Kaohsiung mayor Chen Chu, Tainan County magistrate Su Huan-chih, and Yunlin County magistrate Su Chih-fen.

Issues

Reorganization of factions

Koo's controversial remarks

Results

References 

2008 elections in Taiwan
Democratic Progressive Party chairmanship elections
Democratic Progressive Party chairmanship election